Binkie may refer to

 Hugh Binkie Beaumont (1908–1973), British theatre manager and producer
 Binkie Stuart, Scottish child actress born as Elizabeth Alison Fraser (1932–2001)
 Binkie Huckaback, a character in the BBC Radio programme Round the Horne
 Binkie Muddlefoot, a character from the Disney Animated series Darkwing Duck

See also
 Binky (disambiguation)